Percival David Turnbull  (1953 - 20 August 2016) was a British archaeologist.

Early life
Percival was born in Coxhoe, County Durham, in 1953.  His father was a miner. He studied at the Institute of Archaeology, University of London, graduating in 1975.

Career
Turnbull worked for Durham University and subsequently Durham, North Yorkshire and Cumbria county councils. He founded Brigantia Archaeological Practice in 1995 in Barnard Castle. He was elected a Fellow of the Society of Antiquaries of London in May 1990.
 
In 1983 Turnbull and Colin Haselgrove set up the Stanwick Research Project at the Department of Archaeology, Durham University.

He was a founder member of the Tees River Trust.

Publications
1978, with Jones, R. F. J. and Clack, P. A. G. The archaeology of the coal measures and the magnesium limestone escarpment in Co. Durham : a preliminary survey. Barnard Castle, Bowes Museum.
1984. with Haselgrove, C. Stanwick : excavation and research : interim report 1984. Durham, Durham University Press.
1986. with Manby, T. Archaeology in the Pennines : studies in honour of Arthur Raistrick (BAR British Series 158). Oxford, British Archaeological Reports
2012. County Durham : the hidden history. Stroud, History.

References

British archaeologists
Academics of Durham University
1953 births
2016 deaths
Fellows of the Society of Antiquaries of London
People from Coxhoe
20th-century archaeologists
Alumni of the UCL Institute of Archaeology